Shadey is a 1985 British comedy film directed by Philip Saville and starring Antony Sher, Billie Whitelaw and Patrick Macnee. The screenplay concerns a man with clairvoyant qualities who is recruited by British intelligence for a secret mission.

Cast
 Antony Sher – Oliver Shadey
 Billie Whitelaw – Doctor Cloud
 Patrick Macnee – Sir Cyril Landau
 Larry Lamb – Dick Darnley
 Katherine Helmond – Lady Constance Landau
 Leslie Ash – Carol Landau
 Bernard Hepton – Captain Amies
 Jesse Birdsall – Carl
 Jonathan Scott-Taylor – Arthur
 Jenny Runacre – Shop assistant
 Olivier Pierre – Manson
 Jon Cartwright – Shulman
 Stephen Persaud – Winston

Release
The film premiered at the London Film Festival on 18 November 1985. It was distributed by Mainline Pictures in the United Kingdom.

The film was released by Skouras Pictures in the United States on 5 June 1987 and grossed over $65,817.

Shadey has been very rarely shown on TV - it was shown on Channel 4 in April 1988 as part of its Film On 4 stand and the last known broadcast was on ABC in Australia on Christmas Day 1996. Apart from VHS rental soon after its release, it had long been unavailable on Video, DVD or streaming platforms- until it became available to stream via the Britbox service in September 2021.

References

Bibliography
  Ginibre, Jean-Louis. Ladies Or Gentlemen: A Pictorial History of Male Cross-Dressing in the Movies. Filipacchi, 2005.

External links

1985 films
1985 comedy films
Films directed by Philip Saville
British comedy films
1980s English-language films
1980s British films